Salgueiro is a surname. Notable people with the surname include:

Enrique Salgueiro (born 1981), Spanish cyclist
Jess Salgueiro, Canadian actress
Juan Manuel Salgueiro (born 1983), Uruguayan footballer
Lidia Salgueiro (1917–2009), Portuguese atomic and nuclear physicist
Teresa Salgueiro (born 1969), Portuguese singer

See also
Salguero